Payback is a video game developed and published by Apex Designs. It was first released in 2001. It was followed by a sequel in 2012, Payback 2.

Gameplay
The game is similar in gameplay to the original GTA, with new camera angles and more weapons being obvious differences. The player can use shotguns grenades, as well as weapons such as remote controlled cars carrying explosives.

The game also supports four-player multiplayer deathmatch.

The Game Boy Advance version includes eleven cities.

Development 
It was originally a fan's project to make an Amiga clone of Grand Theft Auto. In the author's own words, "every effort has been made to ensure that Payback beats GTA in every way."

The game was eventually expanded into a commercial release, and in 2002 Apex Designs announced plans to bring it to Microsoft Windows, Macintosh, and the Game Boy Advance (GBA). The Mac version was speedily released, but there is still no word on the Windows version's released date. A version for the GP2X handheld was released in 2006.

Despite the game being a clone of GTA, even copying car names such as the "Mundaneo", Rockstar has made no attempt to stop Apex Designs from publishing this game, or warn them about infringing on their copyrighted materials.

The GBA version was also finished, but Apex Designs couldn't initially find a publisher. After numerous failed attempts to get it published, it was not until late 2004 that DSI Games finally picked up the game.
The GBA version received an age rating from North America's ESRB, however it didn't officially release there.

An iOS version of Payback was announced on December 29, 2008 and released on January 28, 2009. It contains all the features of the GP2X version. The developers announced that it was going to be released on January 15; however due to a bug, it was pushed back to January 28. A behind-the-scenes report is listed on their website.

A sequel to Payback, Payback 2 for iOS and Android devices, was released on 4 October 2012

Additional content
The Amiga version allowed fans to make their own deathmatch maps (see the link below). These cannot be added into the GBA version, but a slightly modified 'Isla Nublar' map is featured as an unlockable bonus.

References

External links
 Payback official site
 Custom map downloads (Mac and Amiga only) 
 iPhone progress report

2001 video games
Amiga 1200 games
Amiga games
Android (operating system) games
Classic Mac OS games
Destination Software games
Freeverse Inc. games
Game Boy Advance games
GP2X games
IOS games
Multiplayer and single-player video games
Organized crime video games
Video game clones
Video games developed in the United Kingdom